Sarcham-e Sofla (also Romanized as Sarcham-e Soflá; also known as Sar Cham, Sarcham-e Pā’īn, and Sarcham Pa’īn) is a village in Zanjanrud-e Pain Rural District, Zanjanrud District, Zanjan County, Zanjan Province, Iran. At the 2006 census, its population was 248, in 49 families.

References 

Populated places in Zanjan County